Chaemoptera is a genus in the Nemopteridae (the spoonwing family of insects). The genus, which consists of three species, is wholly confined to Western Australia.

The genus was first described by William Forsell Kirby in 1900, and the type species is Chasmoptera huttii.

A key feature of Chasmoptera is the "elaborate extended hindwings, with apical dilations arranged in a “ribbon” or “spoon” shape".

Description
Kirby describes the genus as follows (but only lists the one species,  Chasmoptera huttii): 
Later work uses both wing and genital morphology to distinguish both species and genera.

Species
Chasmoptera huttii (Westwood, 1848)
Chasmoptera mathewsi Koch, 1967
Chasmoptera superba Tillyard, 1925

Further reading

References

Neuroptera
Taxa described in 1900